
Bartholomew Cubbins is a fictional page and the hero of two children's books by Dr. Seuss: The 500 Hats of Bartholomew Cubbins (1938) and Bartholomew and the Oobleck (1949). Besides the two books about him—and the stage adaptations of them—Bartholomew Cubbins also appears as a character in the TV show The Wubbulous World of Dr. Seuss. Seuss's only film, The 5,000 Fingers of Dr. T., has a main character named Bartholomew Collins who, like his namesake, is a young boy who is wiser than the adults around him.

Claim of religious significance
Robert L. Short (1932 – July 6, 2009), in his book The Parables of Dr. Seuss, points out that Bartholomew shares a name with one of the apostles of Jesus. Bartholomew Cubbins presses the silly King Derwin of the Kingdom of Didd into humility and repentance, encouraging the king to apologize for his harmful actions.

References

Further reading
 Dr. Seuss and Mr. Geisel, New York, Random House, 1995. 

Dr. Seuss characters
Child characters in literature
Male characters in literature
Literary characters introduced in 1938
Fictional servants